Joué-sur-Erdre (literally Joué on Erdre) is a commune in the Loire-Atlantique department in western France.

Etymology
Joué is first mentioned as Joseio in 1186.

It belongs to the long list of Gallo-Romance toponyms such as Joué, Jouy, Gouy and Occitano-Catalan Gaujac having as origin Gaudiacu cf. Joué-en-Charnie (Sarthe, Gaudiaco 1186) or Joué-Étiau (Maine-et-Loire, Gaudiacus AB 7th, etc. It is a compound of Gaudi(us), a Christian name based on gaudius "joy" and the Gaulish (Celtic) suffix -acum "place, property" cf. Welsh -og.

The Breton name of the people from Yaoued is Yaouedad (for men) and Yaouedadez (for women).

Sur-Erdre ("Upon-the-Erdre") was added in the 19th century and it refers to the river name Erdre, itself from a Celtic *ered "running stream". The river is mentioned as Erda in the 11th century

Geography

Situation
The commune is 29 km north-west of Ancenis and 30 km north-east of Nantes.

The commune is, as the crow flies, 318 km of Paris.

Relief
The highest point in the city is 66 meters above the sea level, the deepest one is seven meters above. The mean elevation is 37 meters above the sea level.

Hydrology

The commune is crossed by the Erdre and the Isac rivers.

The lake Vioreau was extended in 1835 to reach 200 ha.

Climate

Global warming
Although the highest point of the commune is 66 meters above the sea level, the mean level is 37 meters. That is to say that the commune is concerned by the global warming and the elevation of the sea level.

Joué-sur-Erdre is among the 69,68% communes concerned by this elevation.

Town planning

Urban morphology

The commune is made up of the principal village and many other hamlets as Notre-Dame-des-Langueurs, la Demenure, la Mulonnière, Franchaud, la Cormerais, and la Gicquelière.

Communications and transports

The RN 178, running from east/west, crosses Joué-sur-Erdre.

The hamlet of Gros Breil is crossed by the railroad.

The nearest airport is in Ancenis.

Adjacent villages

History
In the 9th century, to shield the country from Norman invasion waves, a fort called Alon was built on what is now known as Joué-sur-Erdre.

At the beginning of the 13th century, the castle of Vioreau and its neighbouring lands were called "Joué" referring to the lord who lived in, Hervé de Joué. In this time, Joué was the heart of the greatest seigniory near Nantes with a surface reaching twenty parishes in the 16th century. It was later assimilated in the Barony of Chateaubriant.

Two castles still exist  in the parish, Lucinière and la Chauvelière. In the first one used to live the bishops of Nantes from the 15th to the 16th centuries. The castle of la Chauvelière used to belong to the Brittany chancellor.

On 13 August 1487, after the failure of the siege of Nantes (from 19 June to 6 August 1487) hold by the duc de Bretagne, King Charles VIII and Anne of Beaujeu encamped with their troops in Joué.

In 1592, during the Holy League, Joué-sur-Erdre and Nort-sur-Erdre hosted  French and Spanish troops headed by the Duke of Mercœur.

On 30 May 1847, the village took its current name of Joué-sur-Erdre.

Economy

Employment
In 2017, the labor force reached 1,162 people. The unemployment rate of the village was 10.9%.

Politics and administration

Political tendencies and results

French European Constitution referendum of 2005

During the European Constitution referendum which took place on 29 May 2005, there were 40,39% voting "yes" and 59,61% voting "no". The abstention rate was 26,04%.

French presidential election of 2007

During the first round Nicolas Sarkozy obtained 27,74% of the votes and Ségolène Royal obtained 25,12%. During the second round 53,06% of the votes were obtained by des voix furent remportées par Nicolas Sarkozy against 46,94% for Ségolène Royal. The participation rate was 86,48% (nationwide : 83,97%) and spoilt vote represented 3,75% of the electors (nationwide : 4,20%).

First round :

The first round was held on April 22, 2007:

The participation rate was 87,25% (national average 83,77%) and spoilt vote represented 1,37% of the votes (national average 1,44%).

Second round :
The second round was held on 6 May 2007:

French legislative election of 2007

Joué-sur-Erdre is part of the Loire-Atlantique's 5th constituency.

During the second round Michel Ménard was elected.

French municipal elections of 2008

Joué-sur-Erdre's population is between 1500 and 2500 inhabitants, thus they elect 19 counsellors.

The new mayor is Jean-Pierre Belleil.

First round :
The first round was on March 9, 2008:

Second round :
The second round was held on March 16, 2008:

List of mayors

Environmental politics
The allée de Chênes ("alley of Oaks") of the château de Lucinière, also called "la Grande Avenue", is a classified environmental site since February 9, 1949. It shelters tercentenaries oaks.

Population

, there are 956 households in Joué-sur-Erdre. Of these, 25.5% consist of a single person, 26.3% of couples without children, 37.6% of couples with children and 9.0% of single parent households.

The median income was € in 2017, which is below the national average of €.

Education
There are two schools in Joué-sur-Erdre : the École primaire privée Saint Louis de Gonzague and the École Roger et Renée Jolivot.

Health
Joué-sur-Erdre is home to a Fire and Emergency Center.

Housing

, there are 1,166 dwellings in Joué-sur-Erdre. Among these 80.7% are main residences, and only 2.7% are apartments. 81.0% of the main residences are owned by their occupant.

Culture and heritage

Sights

Civil monuments
The castel of Vioreau ; built in 1202. It remains only ruins.

The château de Lucinière built in the 14th and 19th centuries. Its chapel, its orangery, its dining room and its internal decoration are historic monuments since December 9, 1985.

The castel of la Chauvelière, 17th and 19th centuries, used to be own by the Brittany chancellor.

Vestiges of the fountain Saint-Léger from 17th-18th centuries

The houses of workers (1717) are in La Vallée.

The city hall is located in an old presbytery built by Father Tiger in 1784. It is the city hall since 1987.

The Hôtel des trois rois where Kings slept, including François Ier (May 1532), Henri II (on 12 July 1551), Charles IX and Catherine de Médicis (on 15 and 16 October 1565).

Churches
There are two churches in Joué-sur-Erdre :
the église Saint-Léger of Joué built in 1883.
the église de Notre-Dame-des-Langueurs, (also called Notre-Dame de la Pitié) built in the beginning of the 20th century. See The works of Jean Fréour. Sculptor of work in Notre-Dame-des-Langueurs church.

Heraldry

Parks
Joué-sur-Erdre hosts two lacs, the lake Vioreau, and the « Little Vioreau » which regularize the water level of the Canal de Nantes à Brest.

Cultural events
Each year the commune celebrate the "Pardon".

Sports and leisure activities
The lake Vioreau allows people to practice several sport activities such as water sports with the ASS Cercle de Voile de Vioreau.

See also

Communes of the Loire-Atlantique department

References

External links
 
 Joué-sur-Erdre on the IGN
 Joué on the Communauté de communes du pays d'Ancenis
 Aerial photos (Panoramio)
 Map.
 Census archives of Joué-sur-Erdre

Communes of Loire-Atlantique